Trachynautilus is a member of the Tainoceratidae, named by Mojsisovics in 1902, with longitudinal ridges on the flanks of its high-arched involute shell.  Phloiocedas from the Upper Triassic of North America is similar except that its venter also has longitudinal ridges. Trachynautilus from the middle and Upper Triassic of Europe has a smooth venter.

References
 Bernhard Kummerl, 1964. Nautiloidea-Nautilida. Treatise on Invertebrate Paleontology Part K. Geological Society of America and University of Kansas Press.

Triassic animals of Europe
Nautiloids
Middle Triassic first appearances
Late Triassic extinctions
Prehistoric nautiloid genera